Vladimir Guerrero Ramos Jr. (born March 16, 1999) is a Canadian-Dominican professional baseball first baseman and designated hitter for the Toronto Blue Jays of Major League Baseball (MLB). He is the son of former MLB player and Hall of Famer Vladimir Guerrero Sr., making his major league debut in April 2019. A right-handed batter and thrower, he is widely regarded as one of MLB's best active hitters. 

Born in Montreal, Guerrero Jr. was signed by the Blue Jays as an international free agent in 2015.  In 2018, he was named Minor League Player of the Year by both Baseball America and USA Today after batting .381 with 20 home runs and 78 runs batted in (RBI) with 38 strikeouts in 95 games.  In 2021, he led the major leagues in home runs (48, tied), runs scored (123), and total bases (363).  He was voted to the AL All-Star roster in 2021, during which he was voted MVP, the youngest to do so in All-Star Game history, while also finishing second in AL MVP votes for the season.

Early life
Vladimir Guerrero Ramos Jr. is the son of baseball Hall of Famer Vladimir Guerrero, and a nephew of former MLB player Wilton Guerrero. He was born in Montreal while his father was playing for the Montreal Expos and is a Canadian citizen. His mother, Riquelma Ramos, learned to speak French while living in Montreal and later moved with him to the Dominican Republic, where Vladimir Jr. spent most of his early childhood. His parents separated when he was very young and his mother moved to Santiago, Dominican Republic. Guerrero would split time between Santiago with his mother, Don Gregorio with his Uncle Wilton, and during the summer, in the United States with his father.

In 2003, Vladimir Sr. received a standing ovation during his final game for the Expos at Olympic Stadium. His teammates sent Vladimir Jr., wearing a child's Expos uniform, out onto the field to join him. His father told him to take off his helmet and wave to the crowd, resulting in what has been called an iconic photo.

As a youth, Guerrero was trained in baseball by his Uncle Wilton. He said of Wilton "I think everything I've learned in baseball has been from him. I've been practicing with him since I was five. He's the one who taught me to practice well."

Professional career

Minor leagues
Eligible for free agency in 2015, Baseball America ranked Guerrero as the top international free agent, and MLB.com ranked him the fourth-best. He signed with Toronto on July 2, 2015, for $3.9 million at age 16. Guerrero was assigned to extended spring training camp to open the 2016 minor league season. Guerrero made his professional baseball debut with the Rookie Advanced Bluefield Blue Jays on June 23. Guerrero hit his first professional home run on June 24, a two-run shot in a 4–2 loss to the Bristol Pirates. On August 12, Guerrero recorded his first multi-home run game, hitting two solo shots in an 18–5 win against the Pulaski Yankees. Later in August, he was named the Appalachian League's All-Star at third base. Guerrero played in 62 games for Bluefield in 2016, and hit .271 with eight home runs, 46 runs batted in (RBI), and 15 stolen bases. On January 24, 2017, MLB named Guerrero the third best prospect at third base heading into the 2017 minor league season.

Guerrero opened the 2017 minor league season with the Class-A Lansing Lugnuts. In a 6–3 win over the Great Lakes Loons on April 7, he hit his first home run of the season. Guerrero was named a Midwest League All-Star on June 7, and on June 29, he was named to the World team roster for the 2017 All-Star Futures Game. On July 6, the Blue Jays announced Guerrero would be promoted to the Advanced-A Dunedin Blue Jays following the All-Star Futures Game. In a game against the Clearwater Threshers on August 31, Guerrero hit a home run to give the Blue Jays a 5–3 victory, with the win ensuring Dunedin would make the Florida State League playoffs. Guerrero finished the 2017 regular season with a .323 batting average, 13 home runs, and 76 RBI in 119 games played. He also walked more than he struck out, with 76 and 62 respectively, and posted a .910 on-base plus slugging percentage (OPS). On September 6, Guerrero was named ESPN's Prospect of the Year. During the offseason, he played in 26 games  for the Leones del Escogido of the Dominican Winter League.

Entering the 2018 season, Guerrero was considered the top prospect in the Blue Jays organization by MLB and Baseball America. On March 23, Blue Jays team president Mark Shapiro announced that Guerrero would begin the season with the Double-A New Hampshire Fisher Cats. Through the first month of the season, he led the Eastern League with a .398 batting average and 30 runs batted in. On June 4, Guerrero was named the Eastern League's Player of the Month after hitting .438 with nine home runs and 28 RBI in May. On June 6, Guerrero was removed from a game against the Akron RubberDucks with a leg injury. Three days later, it was determined that he had a strained patellar ligament in his left knee, and would be on the disabled list for at least four weeks. On July 28, it was announced that Guerrero would be promoted to the Triple-A Buffalo Bisons following his father's induction into the National Baseball Hall of Fame and Museum. Guerrero hit .402 with 14 home runs and 60 RBI in 61 games with New Hampshire. On August 30, the Blue Jays added Guerrero to the roster of the Surprise Saguaros of the Arizona Fall League (AFL).

Entering 2019 spring training, questions arose as to whether the Blue Jays organization would have Guerrero on the Opening Day roster, or seek to manipulate his MLB service time by assigning him to the minors to begin the season. Keeping Guerrero in the minor leagues for the first two weeks of the season would prevent him from reaching free agency until after the 2025 season. On March 10, the Blue Jays announced that Guerrero had suffered an oblique strain two days earlier and was ruled out for the rest of spring training.

Toronto Blue Jays

2019 

On April 24, 2019, the Blue Jays announced that Guerrero would be called up from Triple-A Buffalo on April 26. Guerrero was considered the top prospect in all of professional baseball prior to being called up, and was hitting .367/.424/.700 with three home runs and eight RBIs during an eight-game stint with Buffalo in 2019. He went hitless in his first three at-bats against the Oakland Athletics before hitting a double in the bottom of the ninth inning and exiting for a pinch runner. Guerrero recorded his first multi hit game, and reached base safely four times, on May 11.

On May 14, against the San Francisco Giants in Oracle Park, Guerrero hit his first major league home run in the first inning off Nick Vincent. At 20 years and 59 days of age, Guerrero became the youngest Blue Jay to hit a home run, breaking Danny Ainge's record by 18 days. In the sixth inning, with two men on, he hit another home run off Reyes Moronta. He hit two more home runs in the following series against the Chicago White Sox, including one that bounced off the glove of center fielder Leury Garcia and over the wall. Guerrero's four home runs over a six-game road trip earned him the American League Player of the Week Award, and made him the youngest Blue Jay to win the award. On May 22, he hit his first home run at the Rogers Centre off Rick Porcello of the Boston Red Sox. On May 31, Guerrero's sixth home run, against the Colorado Rockies, was the 1,135th home run in May throughout Major League Baseball, breaking the MLB record for most home runs in a single month. On July 8, he broke the single round home run record in the Home Run Derby with a total of 40 home runs after three overtimes in the semifinals against Joc Pederson. He also broke the record for most home runs in a derby with 91, although he lost the final round to Pete Alonso. In 2019, Guerrero batted .272/.339/.433 with 15 home runs and 69 RBI in 464 at bats. He hit a ball with the highest exit velocity (118.9 mph) of all balls hit by major league batters in 2019.

2020 
The start of the 2020 campaign was delayed into July by the COVID-19 pandemic. On July 10, Blue Jays manager Charlie Montoyo announced that Guerrero would shift primarily to playing first base, but would still play at third base and designated hitter when necessary. Overall with the 2020 Blue Jays, Guerrero played in all 60 games of the shortened season and batted .262 with nine home runs and 33 RBIs.

2021 

Guerrero began the 2021 MLB season at a substantially lower weight than he did each of the previous two seasons. After beginning a weight loss regimen in July 2020, Guerrero went on to lose 42 pounds. The reduced weight made him feel "quicker, stronger and more resilient." Guerrero opened the 2021 season as the Blue Jays primary first baseman while also getting routine starts at the designated hitter position.

On April 27, 2021, Guerrero had his first career three-homer game, including a grand slam against Washington Nationals starter Max Scherzer, to go along with 7 RBI on the day. On June 21, Guerrero rejected an invitation to participate in the 2021 Home Run Derby, despite setting the records for most home runs in a single round (29) and most home runs in a single derby (91) in 2019. He stated that he was looking forward to playing in the All-Star Game but would like to use the time to otherwise regroup and "refresh mentally" for the second half of the season. On June 26, Guerrero hit his 50th career home run in his 258th career game, reaching the milestone in the exact same number of games as his father.

The MLB announced on June 27 that Guerrero was a voting finalist for the starting first base position at the 2021 All-Star Game in Colorado, having led all MLB players in Phase 1 of voting with 2,704,788 votes. The next closest vote-getter was Ronald Acuña Jr., a center fielder for the Atlanta Braves of the National League. On June 28, Guerrero was named the American League Player of the Week, after hitting home runs in three consecutive games, driving in seven runs and batting to a .391/.481/.826 slash line. It was Guerrero's first Player of the Week honor since August 2019. On July 1, Guerrero was named the starting first baseman for the American League in the All-Star Game. In the game, he hit the 200th home run in All-Star Game history, became part of the third father-son duo to hit home runs in All-Star Games, and was named as the game's Most Valuable Player. He was the first Blue Jays player to win, the first Canadian citizen to win, and the youngest All-Star Game MVP at age 22 and 119 days, beating Ken Griffey Jr. when he was 22 and 236 days. On September 6, in a game against the New York Yankees, Guerrero hit his 40th home run of the season, joining his father as the second father-son duo in MLB history to each have a 40-home run season in their careers. Previously, the only father and son to have done so were Cecil Fielder and his son Prince, both of whom played during the career of the elder Guerrero.

Guerrero finished the 2021 season batting .311/.401/.601 and tied the major league lead in home runs with Salvador Pérez (48), led in runs scored (123), and led the majors in total bases (363). He won the American League Hank Aaron Award & the Tip O'Neill Award for 2021,  but finished second in American League MVP voting behind Shohei Ohtani.

2022
On March 22, 2022, Guerrero signed a $7.9 million contract with the Blue Jays, avoiding salary arbitration. During an April 13, 2022, game against the New York Yankees, Guerrero hit a home run off Gerrit Cole and subsequently had his hand stepped on by Aaron Hicks  during a play at first base. Despite the injury, he remained in the game and hit two more home runs, finishing the day at 4-for-4 with 3 home runs and 4 RBIs.

Guerrero then became the first player in Major League history to hit three home runs in a game (April 13), then strike out at least four times the following game (April 14).

Later that season, Guerrero was named to start the All-Star Game at first base for the American League.

In a game against the Tampa Bay Rays on September 14, he hit a home run, which was his 100th home run of his career. With this home run, he became the youngest Blue Jay to 100 home runs, and the 7th youngest player in MLB history to 100 home runs and 100 doubles.

In 2022 he led the major leagues in doubles plays grounded into (26), and batted .274/.339/.480	with 32 home runs, 97 RBIs, and 116 strikeouts. He was named as a finalist for a Gold Glove Award for his defensive play at first base in the American League, and announced as the winner of the award on November 1.

Scouting report
Guerrero was seen as a top prospect due to his exceptional hitting ability, which scouts often graded an 80, the highest possible mark on baseball's 20-to-80 scouting scale. His power often received a 70 grade, which indicates a "plus-plus" tool in the scouting industry. Defensively, scouts were unsure if he could remain at third base at the major league level, but he has shown the potential to develop into a passable defender. However, Keith Law has stated that due to Guerrero's body type, he is a future designated hitter.

Personal life
Guerrero speaks English with his Blue Jays teammates and team staff but gives media interviews, including the one on the field after winning the 2021 All-Star Game MVP, in Spanish using the team's interpreter. In 2019 he said, "I'm trying to learn as quickly as possible so I can talk to fans." Due to his upbringing in Montreal, he is also fluent in French. His cousin Gabriel Guerrero also plays professional baseball. Guerrero has two daughters. In a 2012 paternity suit it was revealed that Vladimir Sr. has eight children with five different women, meaning Vladimir Jr. has at least seven siblings. He has been cared for by his paternal grandmother, Altagracia, during his time in the Blue Jays organization. Guerrero is a Christian.

Guerrero's brother, Pablo, signed with the Texas Rangers as an international free agent in January 2023.

See also

 List of Major League Baseball annual runs scored leaders
 List of Major League Baseball players from Canada
 List of Major League Baseball players from the Dominican Republic
 List of second-generation Major League Baseball players
 Toronto Blue Jays award winners and league leaders

Notes

References

External links

1999 births
Living people
American League All-Stars
American League home run champions
Baseball people from Quebec
Black Canadian baseball players
Bluefield Blue Jays players
Buffalo Bisons (minor league) players
Canadian expatriate baseball players in the United States
Canadian people of Dominican Republic descent
Sportspeople of Dominican Republic descent
Dominican Republic expatriate baseball players in the United States
Dunedin Blue Jays players
Gold Glove Award winners
Gulf Coast Blue Jays players
Lansing Lugnuts players
Leones del Escogido players
Major League Baseball All-Star Game MVPs
Major League Baseball players from Canada
Major League Baseball third basemen
New Hampshire Fisher Cats players
Silver Slugger Award winners
Baseball players from Montreal
Surprise Saguaros players
Toronto Blue Jays players